The 2019–20 Israeli Basketball National League (or the Liga Leumit) is the 20th season of the Israeli Basketball National League.

Teams
The following teams had changed divisions after the 2018–19 season:

Relegated from Premier League
Bnei Herzliya

Promoted from Liga Artzit
A.S. Ramat Hasharon
Hapoel Hevel Modi'in

Venues and locations

League table

Regular season

Rounds 1 to 26

Awards

MVP of the Round

See also
2019–20 Israeli Basketball Premier League
2019–20 Israeli Basketball State Cup

References

Israeli
Basketball